César Altair Zanetti Ramos (born 25 July 1989 in Novo Hamburgo) is a Brazilian racing driver currently competing in the Stock Car Pro Series with Ipiranga Racing. Ramos has also previously raced in Formula Renault, Italian Formula Three, Blancpain GT, Endurance Brasil, and GT Sprint Race.

Career

Formula Renault 2.0
Ramos began his car racing career by driving in the Italian Formula Renault Championship with the BVM Minardi team in 2007. He finished 14th in the standings, taking nine points–scoring positions in fourteen races, including a podium in the final race of the season at Monza. He also contested six races of the Eurocup Formula Renault 2.0 season for the same team. Ramos continued his progress in the Italian series, by committing to a Winter Series campaign. He claimed four wins, pole positions and fastest laps en–route to a comfortable championship title.

The following season, Ramos competed in both the Eurocup and Formula Renault 2.0 Italy championships for BVM Minardi. He finished seventh in the Eurocup standings, taking seven points–scoring positions in fourteen races, including a podium in the second race of the season at Spa–Francorchamps. In the Italian series, he took sixth place in the championship, scoring four podium places.

Formula Three
Ramos moved to Manor Motorsport and the Formula 3 Euro Series in 2009, but left the series after the Barcelona round, eventually winding up 25th in the championship standings.

2010 saw Ramos move to the Italian Formula Three Championship with the BVM–Target Racing team. After securing three race wins and eight podium places, he won the title at the final round of the season in Monza, finishing eight points ahead of Stéphane Richelmi.

Ramos, along with Richelmi and Andrea Caldarelli, tested a Ferrari F2008 Formula One car as a prize for finishing in the top three in the championship, with the test taking place at Vallelunga on Thursday 2 December. After completing 30 laps, Ramos finished second fastest behind Caldarelli with a best lap time of 1:17.10.

Formula Renault 3.5 Series

After taking part in post–season Formula Renault 3.5 Series testing, Ramos will graduate to the championship in 2011, joining Alexander Rossi at Fortec Motorsport.

In June 2012 the New Zealand Lotus Team driver Richie Stanaway crashed heavily during a race at Spa Francorchamps and Ramos has taken his race seat until Stanaway's recovery is complete.

GT Racing
Ramos competed in the 2013 Blancpain Endurance Series season for Kessel Racing, driving alongside Daniel Zampieri and Davide Rigon for the full five-race series. The trio won the opening round at Autodromo Nazionale Monza on April 14, and ended up finishing fourth in the championship. Ramos is currently signed with Belgian Audi Club WRT in the Blancpain Endurance Series, co-driving with Marc Basseng and Laurens Vanthoor.

Notably, Ramos, driving alongside Daniel Zampieri and Michał Broniszewski, finished third in the 2013 Gulf 12 Hours.

Other Series
In December 2010, Ramos took part in the second pre–season FIA Formula Two Championship test in Barcelona, finishing fourth fastest on day one before improving to third overall on the second day, setting a fastest session time in the process.

Racing record

Career summary

† – As Ramos was a guest driver, he was ineligible for championship points.

Complete Formula 3 Euro Series results
(key)

Complete Formula Renault 3.5 Series results
(key) (Races in bold indicate pole position) (Races in italics indicate fastest lap)

Stock Car Brasil

References

External links
  
 
 
 Interview and biography in Brazilian newspaper 

1989 births
Living people
People from Novo Hamburgo
Brazilian racing drivers
Italian Formula Renault 2.0 drivers
Formula Renault Eurocup drivers
Formula 3 Euro Series drivers
Italian Formula Three Championship drivers
World Series Formula V8 3.5 drivers
Blancpain Endurance Series drivers
International GT Open drivers
Stock Car Brasil drivers
24 Hours of Spa drivers
Manor Motorsport drivers
Sportspeople from Rio Grande do Sul
BVM Target drivers
Charouz Racing System drivers
W Racing Team drivers
Fortec Motorsport drivers